Novoiavorivsk, alternatively transliterated Novoyavorivsk, is a city in the Yavoriv district, Lviv region of Ukraine. Novoiavorivsk hosts the administration of Novoiavorivsk urban hromada, one of the hromadas of Ukraine.

The name of the town translates to "New Yavoriv".

History
The town is about 45 minute trip from the oblast's administrative centre Lviv. The town is located on a major road, which ends at the border of Poland as the E40 and continues to Lviv.

The town was founded in 1965 as a workers' settlement called Jantarne. In 1969 it was renamed to Novoiavorivsk.

In 1984, a town club was built here.

In 1985, a new well-maintained school for 1,568 students was built here. City since 1986.

In January 1989 the population was 24 320 people. The largest enterprise was a plant of reinforced concrete structures.

Novoiavorivsk's city center contains a large square with the town's "Palace of Culture" building and the town's church. The town also contains a football field.

In the town based Hockey Club Levy.

Novoiavorivsk is twinned with Leżajsk, Poland.

Transport 
A railway station is located here, it is called Jantarne Train Station. It has one or two regional trains per day.

Notable people
 Andriy "Kuzma" Kuzmenko — lead singer of the band "Skryabin".
 Vasyl Pryima (b. 1991) — Ukrainian footballer.

Gallery

Sport
The town is home to ice hockey club HC Levy.

References

External links

 

Cities in Lviv Oblast
Populated places established in 1965
Populated places established in the Ukrainian Soviet Socialist Republic
Cities of district significance in Ukraine